Constance Bapela (died 16 February 2018) was a former speaker for the South African city of Johannesburg, and wife of current Deputy Minister of Co-operative Governance and Traditional Affairs Obed Bapela.

Death
Bapela died of a heart attack, three days after a surgery, on 16 February 2018.

See also

African Commission on Human and Peoples' Rights
Constitution of South Africa
History of the African National Congress
Politics in South Africa
Provincial governments of South Africa

References

20th-century births
2018 deaths
21st-century South African women politicians
21st-century South African politicians
People from Johannesburg